Ablation Lake is a proglacial tidal lake in Ablation Valley, Alexander Island, Antarctica, with stratified saline and fresh water and depths exceeding . The feature is dammed in the upper portion by ice that pushes into the lake from the adjacent George VI Ice Shelf. It is named after Ablation Valley following British Antarctic Survey (BAS) limnological research from 1973. The site lies within Antarctic Specially Protected Area (ASPA) No.147.

See also
Ablation Point

References

Lakes of Antarctica
Bodies of water of Alexander Island
Antarctic Specially Protected Areas